Titan Klin is an ice hockey team in Klin, Russia. They play in the VHL, the second level of Russian ice hockey. The club was established in 1991 as a successor of a minor amateur team Khimik Klin that existed since 1953.

Titan played in the First League starting with 2003 until it joined the VHL in the 2011–2012 season. Titan became a farm club of Severstal Cherepovets in 2012. Previously it was affiliated with Atlant Moscow Oblast.

Winner
 Eastern European Hockey Cup (EEHC) – 2005/2006

External links
Official site
Fansite

Ice hockey teams in Russia
Eastern European Hockey League teams